Saeid Ahmadabbasi (born 31 July 1992) is an Iranian professional futsal player. He is currently a member of F.S. Valdepeñas in the Primera División de Futsal.

Honours

International 
 AFC Futsal Championship
 Champion (1): 2018
 Runner-up (1): 2022
 Asian Indoor and Martial Arts Games
 Champion (1): 2017

Club 

 AFC Futsal Club Championship
 Champion (1): 2015 (Tasisat Daryaei)
 Runner-Up (1): 2017 (Giti Pasand)
 Iranian Futsal Super League
 Champion (2): 2014–15 (Tasisat Daryaei) - 2015–16 (Tasisat Daryaei)
 Runner-Up (3): 2018–19 (Giti Pasand) - 2019–20 (Giti Pasand) - 2020–21 (Giti Pasand)

Individual 

 Iranian Futsal Super League top scorer (1): 2020–21 (Giti Pasand) (26 goals)

References 

1992 births
Living people
People from Tonekabon
Sportspeople from Mazandaran province
Iranian men's futsal players
Futsal forwards
Tasisat Daryaei FSC players
Giti Pasand FSC players
Iranian expatriate futsal players
Iranian expatriate sportspeople in Spain